Fort Charles may refer to:

 Fort Charles (Ghana), built in 1674 
 Fort Charles (Jamaica), built between 1650 and 1660
 Fort Charles, later Fort William Henry (Pemaquid Beach, Maine), built in 1677
 Fort Charles (Menorca), which fell to the British during the Capture of Minorca (1798)
 Fort Charles (Nebraska), a trading fort established in 1795 in the Nebraska Territory
 Fort Charles (Nevis), built in the 1630s
 Fort Charles (Saint Kitts), established 1670
 Salcombe Castle, or Fort Charles, in Devon, England
 Fort Saint Jacques, or Fort Charles, founded in 1668 on James Bay in present-day Quebec
 Fort Charles (HBC vessel), operated by the HBC from 1940-1959, see Hudson's Bay Company vessels

See also

Charles Fort (disambiguation), including Charlesfort